Kalliohasu  is a Swedish island belonging to the Haparanda archipelago. The island is located near Nikkala. It has no shore connection and no buildings.

References 

Islands of Sweden